Cheadle is a civil parish in the district of Staffordshire Moorlands, Staffordshire, England. It contains 77 listed buildings that are recorded in the National Heritage List for England. Of these, one is listed at Grade I, the highest of the three grades, two are at Grade II*, the middle grade, and the others are at Grade II, the lowest grade.  The parish contains the town of Cheadle, and smaller settlements, including Freehay, and the surrounding countryside.  Most of the listed buildings are houses and associated structures, cottages, shops and offices, the majority of which are within the town.  The other listed buildings include churches, items in churchyards, public houses and hotels, a market cross, milestones and a milepost, a school, and a drinking fountain.


Key

Buildings

References

Citations

Sources

Lists of listed buildings in Staffordshire